Boy Better Know, often abbreviated as BBK, is a British grime collective and record label. The collective was founded in North London in 2005 as an independent record label by brothers Jamie and Joseph Adenuga, better known as Jme, and Skepta. The first of them also serves as a sole owner and director of an associated company, Boy Better Know Limited, incorporated in 2008. All members of the collective use the record label as a means to publish their music, and is digitally distributed by The Orchard, a subsidiary of Sony Music.

History
In the early 2000s, Meridian Crew, consisting of MCs President T, Skepta, Jme, Big H, Bossman Birdie, Meridian Dan and Paper Pabs regularly appeared on pirate radio stations, including Heat FM and later on Déjà Vu FM. In 2005, Meridian Crew dissolved after affiliates of the crew were convicted on attempted murder charges. After this event, Jme founded Boy Better Know alongside his brother Skepta while other Meridian members reformed as Meridian Bloodline, known later simply as Bloodline.

In its early period, "Boy Better Know" was well known for its line of eponymous T-shirts. The crew also had a regular show on Rinse FM with DJ Maximum. Jme's debut album, Famous?, was released on the label in 2008. "Too Many Man", the first single from the album, was released on 25 May 2009. The song is also featured on the Wiley and Skepta albums, Race Against Time and Microphone Champion, respectively. The song was written because of Skepta's annoyance over 'the lack of women in clubs'. It entered the UK Singles Chart on 6 June 2009 at number 97, reaching number 79 the next week. The second single from the album V.I.P, titled "Goin' In", was released for download on iTunes on 13 December 2009.

Jme's second studio album, Blam!, was released on 4 October 2010. Three singles from this album were released; "Over Me", "Sidetracked", which features Wiley, and "CD is Dead" featuring UK grime artist Tempa T.

In 2008, Boy Better Know pioneered a short-lived dance fad called the "Rolex Sweep" which accompanied the song of the same name by Skepta.

In November 2011, Boy Better Know Mobile was established, a 3G network which leases network bandwidth from Hutchison 3G. This venture was ended in mid-2013.

In October 2018, Wiley began a feud with Skepta and Dizzee Rascal over Skepta working with Dizzee on the track 'Money Right'. On 19 November Wiley released the track 'Flip the Table', where he refers to Dizzee as the 'Grime scene quitter'.

Notable members

Musicians
 Jme 
 Skepta 
 Jammer 
 Frisco  
 Shorty 
 Solo 45 
 Wiley  (Feuding between BBK founder Skepta and Dizzee Rascal as well as other grime artists led to Wiley leaving the group and label)

Discography

Albums
 Wiley – Da 2nd Phaze (2006)
 Skepta – Greatest Hits (2007)
 Jme – Famous? (2008)
 Skepta – Microphone Champion (2009)
 Jme – Blam! (2010)
 Frisco – Fully Grown (2010)
 Jme – History: (2011)
 Shorty – Short Notice (2011)
 Frisco – Back 2 Da Lab Compilation (2011)
 Skepta – Blacklisted (2012)
 Jammer – Living the Dream (2013)
 Frisco – British Nights (2014)
 Jme – Integrity (2015)
 Frisco – System Killer (2016)
 Skepta – Konnichiwa (2016)
 Shorty – Moesh Music (2016)
 Wiley – Godfather (2017)^
 Frisco – Serrvice (2017)
 Frisco – Back 2 Da Lab Vol. 5 (2018)
 Wiley – Godfather II (2018)^
 Skepta – Ignorance is Bliss (2019)
 Jme – Grime MC (2019)
 Frisco – The Familiar Stranger (2020)
 Jme, Shorty, Frisco, Capo Lee – Norf Face (2021)
 Skepta – All In (2021)
 Frisco - Tottenham (2022)

^ = Released on CTA Records; not released via Boy Better Know Records

Singles

References

External links
 Boy Better Know label at Discogs
 Boy Better Know artist at Discogs
 BBK (Boy Better Know) on Facebook

British record labels
Grime music groups
English hip hop groups
British independent record labels
Rappers from London